Lee-Ann McPhillips (born 9 June 1964 in New Plymouth) is a former long-distance runner from New Zealand. She runs for Hamilton City Hawks Athletic Club. She represented her native country at the 1998 Commonwealth Games and 2000 World Cross Country Championships. She was a two-time national marathon winner and two-time national 10k road race winner.

Competition record
1990 OCEANIA CHAMPIONSHIPS 20 Kilometres Road Race (Fiji)
 - 20k Road Race (1:22:22)

1991 Huntly Half Marathon
 - (82.32)

1991 New Zealand Marathon (New Plymouth)
 - Marathon (2:40:12)

1992 New Zealand Marathon (Auckland)
 - Marathon (2:40:00)

1998 Commonwealth Games (Kuala Lumpur,)
5th place - Marathon (2'49:36)

1999 national 8000m Waikato-BOP Cross Country Champs
 - (34:18)

1999 national 10k Road Race
 - (30.06)

2000 national 10k Road Race
 - (34:00) 

2000 national 8000m Waikato-BOP Cross Country Champs
 - (28.35)

2000 World Cross Country Championships (Vilamoura, Portugal)
67th place - (29:04; 68)

2001 Hamilton Women's Run 
 - (17:02)

2001 adidas New Zealand Track & Field Championships, women's 5000m, Hastings

References

1964 births
Living people
New Zealand female long-distance runners
Commonwealth Games competitors for New Zealand
Athletes (track and field) at the 1998 Commonwealth Games